This is a list of politicians in Europe of Chinese descent:

France
  曾宪建 (born in Reunion Island; Hakka ancestry): First Chinese elected to the French National Assembly and the first Chinese elected to a parliament in Europe, 1986-2006
 Buon Tan (born in Phnom Penh, in a Chinese Cambodian family) : elected to the French National Assembly in 2017 for Paris's 9th constituency.

Ireland
 Hazel Chu: Green Party member of the Dublin City Council (2019–present) and former Lord Mayor of Dublin. Born in Dublin to Chinese immigrant parents.

Netherlands
 Khee Liang Phoa 潘科良 (local born; parents migrated from Indonesia): Secretary of state for Emancipation and Family Affairs, 2002-2003
 Ing Yoe Tan 陈英茹 (local born; parents migrated from Indonesia): Member, Senate, 1998-2011 
 Varina Tjon-A-Ten (born in Suriname; mixed blood with paternal Hakka Chinese grandfather from China): Member, House of Representatives, 2003–2006.
 Mei Li Vos (local born; mixed blood with Chinese Indonesian mother): Member, House of Representatives, 2007–2010, 2012–2017, Member, Senate Senate, 2019-present 
 Roy Ho Ten Soeng 何天送 (born in Suriname; Hakka ancestry): Mayor, Venhuizen, North Holland, 2000–2006; First immigrant Mayor of Netherlands; First Chinese Mayor of Netherlands and Europe

United Kingdom
 Lydia Dunn, Baroness Dunn 邓莲如 (born in Hong Kong; Zhejiang ancestry): Member, House of Lords, 1990-2010
 Michael Chan, Baron Chan 曾秋坤 (born in Singapore): Member, House of Lords, 2001-2006
 Nat Wei, Baron Wei 韦鸣恩 (local born; parents migrated from Hong Kong; Hakka ancestry): Member, House of Lords, 2011–present
 Anna Lo 盧曼華 (born in British Hong Kong; Cantonese ancestry): Member, Northern Ireland Assembly, 2007-2016
 Alan Mak MP (local born, parents migrated from Guangdong Province via Hong Kong): Member, House of Commons, 2015-present
 Sarah Owen (local born; mixed blood with Chinese mother): Member, House of Commons, 2019–present

See also 
 List of politicians of Chinese descent

References 

!
Politicians
Politicians of European nations